The coat of arms that serves as a symbol of the Subcarpathian Voivodeship, Poland.

Design 
The coat of arms is made of the Iberian style escutcheon that is divided vertically into two parts, that are of red and blue colour. On the left side, within the red part, is a silver (white) griffin with a golden (yellow) crown, beak, and claws. On the right, within the blue part, is a golden (yellow) Ruthenian lion with a red tongue. In the middle, in the upper part, above the creatures, is a silver (white) cross pattée with the edges of the arms concave throughout.

Symbolism 
The griffin in the coat of arms symbols the Belz Voivodeship, while the Ruthenian lion, the Ruthenian Voivodeship. Both of those voivodeships were part of the  Polish–Lithuanian Commonwealth, from 15th to 18th century, and were located where, in modern times, the Subcarpathian Voivodeship is located. The cross pattée comes from the coat of arms of the city of Rzeszów, which is the capital of the voivodeship.

History 
The coat of arms was established as the symbol of the voivodeship on 28 August 2000.

References 

Podkarpackie Voivodeship
Subcarpathian Voivodeship
Subcarpathian Voivodeship
Subcarpathian Voivodeship
Subcarpathian Voivodeship
Subcarpathian Voivodeship
2000 establishments in Poland